Gilles Lapouge (7 November 1923 – 31 July 2020) was a French writer and journalist with the daily O Estado de S. Paulo. He won the 2007 Prix Femina Essai.

Life
He grew up in Algeria, where his father was in the military.
After studying history and geography, he became a journalist.
In 1950 he moved to Brazil.
For three years he worked for the Brazilian newspaper O Estado de S. Paulo, where he remained a correspondent in France for more than forty years.
Back in France, he worked in Le Monde, the Figaro Littéraire and Combat.
He participated in the Bernard Pivot program, "Ouvrez les guillemets" ("Open the quotes") which became Apostrophes". In France Culture, he produced the show "Agora" and then "En étrange pays" ("in foreign countries").

He served on the editorial board of  La Quinzaine littéraire.
He appeared at the Étonnants voyageurs festival at Saint-Malo. He died at the age of 96 on 31 July 2020.

Works
Les Pirates, Payot, 1987
Équinoxiale, Flammarion, Paris, 1977, 
Un soldat en déroute, Folio
Le Singe de la montre, 1982
Utopie et civilisations, 1973
La Révolution sans modèle, with François Châtelet and Olivier Revault d'Allonnes, Mouton, 1974
La Bataille de Wagram, Flammarion, Prix des Deux Magots, 1987
La Folie Koenigsmark, A. Michel, 1996
L'Incendie de Copenhague, A. Michel, Prix Cazes, 1996
Le Bruit de la neige, A. Michel
Besoin de mirages, Seuil, 1998
Au revoir l’Amazonie, 2000 (publié sur Internet, au Brésil)
La Mission des frontières, A. Michel, 2002
Le Bois des amoureux, A. Michel, 2006
L'Encre du voyageur, A. Michel, 2007
La Légende de la géographie, A. Michel, 2009
La Maison des lettres. Conversations avec Christophe Mercier, Phébus, 2009
Dictionnaire amoureux du Brésil, Ed. Plon, Paris, 2011,

References

1923 births
Prix Femina essai winners
Prix des Deux Magots winners
Joseph Kessel Prize recipients
Prix Roger Caillois recipients
Prix Louis Guilloux winners
2020 deaths
People from Digne-les-Bains
20th-century French non-fiction writers
21st-century French non-fiction writers
French historical novelists
French travel writers
20th-century French male writers
French male non-fiction writers